The 1964 Arizona gubernatorial election took place on November 3, 1964. Incumbent Governor Paul Fannin decided not to run for reelection to a fourth term as governor, instead deciding to successfully run for the United States Senate when incumbent U.S. Senator Barry Goldwater decided to run for President of the United States.

Despite Goldwater being at the top of the ticket as the Republican nominee for President against Lyndon Johnson, Samuel Pearson Goddard, who lost to Fannin in 1962, won the Democratic nomination and subsequently the general election, defeating Arizona Republican Party Chairman Richard Kleindienst (who would later serve as US Attorney General in the administration of Richard Nixon). Goddard was sworn into his first and only term as governor on January 4, 1965.

Republican primary
The Republican primary took place on September 8, 1964. Incumbent Governor Paul Fannin decided not to run for a fourth consecutive term, instead opting to run for the United States Senate seat being vacated by U.S. Senator Barry Goldwater, who had instead decided to run for President of the United States. Arizona Republican Party Chairman Richard Kleindienst, as well as state senator and 1962 Republican U.S. Senate nominee Evan Mecham sought the Republican nomination to succeed Paul Fannin, with Kleindienst winning by a wide margin.

Candidates
 Richard Kleindienst, Arizona Republican Party Chairman, former state representative
 Evan Mecham, former state senator, U.S. Senate nominee in 1962

Results

Democratic primary

Candidates
 Samuel P. Goddard, 1962 Democratic nominee for governor
 Art Brock
 J. Michael Morris
 David C. Cox

Results

General election

Results

References

1964
1964 United States gubernatorial elections
Gubernatorial
November 1964 events in the United States